Stewart McLatchie, MM (19 August 1896 – 31 January 1968) was an Australian rules footballer who played with Carlton and Fitzroy in the Victorian Football League (VFL).

Military service
McLatchie, a farmer from Sale, fought in World War I and was awarded a Military Medal for bravery.

Football
He was first rover in the Carlton team that lost the 1921 VFL Grand Final to Richmond, by just four points.

A five-time VFL representative, McLatchie went to Fitzroy in 1925 but finished the season at Brunswick.

He was a member of Brunswick's 1925 premiership side.

Notes

1896 births
1968 deaths
Australian rules footballers from Victoria (Australia)
Australian Rules footballers: place kick exponents
Carlton Football Club players
Fitzroy Football Club players
Sale Football Club players
Brunswick Football Club players
Australian military personnel of World War I
Australian recipients of the Military Medal
People from Sale, Victoria
Military personnel from Victoria (Australia)